Klout was a website and mobile app that used social media analytics to rate its users according to online social influence via the "Klout Score", which was a numerical value between 1 and 100. In determining the user score, Klout measured the size of a user's social media network and correlated the content created to measure how other users interact with that content. Klout launched in 2008.

Lithium Technologies, who acquired the site in March 2014, closed the service on May 25, 2018.

Klout used Bing, Facebook, Foursquare, Google+, Instagram, LinkedIn (individuals' pages, not corporate/business), Twitter, Wikipedia, and  data to create Klout user profiles that were assigned a "Klout Score". Klout scores ranged from 1 to 100, with higher scores corresponding to a higher ranking of the breadth and strength of one's online social influence. While all Twitter users were assigned a score, users who registered at Klout could link multiple social networks, of which network data was then aggregated to influence the user's Klout Score.

Methodology

Klout measured influence by using data points from Twitter, such as the following count, follower count, retweets, list memberships, how many spam/dead accounts were following you, how influential the people who retweet you were and unique mentions. This information was combined with data from a number of other social network followings and interactions to come up with the Klout Score. Other accounts such as Flickr, Blogger, Tumblr, Last.fm, and WordPress could also be linked by users, but they did not weigh into the Klout Score. Microsoft announced a strategic investment in Klout in September 2012 whereby Bing would have access to Klout influence technology, and Klout would have access to Bing search data for its scoring algorithm.

Klout scores were supplemented with three nominally more specific measures, which Klout calls "true reach", "amplification" and "network impact". True reach is based on the size of a user's engaged audience who actively engage in the user's messages. Amplification score relates to the likelihood that one's messages will generate actions, such as retweets, mentions, likes and comments. Network impact reflects the computed influence value of a person's engaged audience.

History
In 2007, Joe Fernandez underwent a surgery that required him to wire his mouth shut. Because he could not speak for three months, he turned to Facebook and Twitter for social interaction. During this period, he became obsessed with the idea that "word of mouth was measurable." Pulling data from Twitter’s API, he created a prototype that would assign users a score out of 100 to measure their influence. Midway into 2008, he showed the prototype to some friends, who told him it was "the dumbest thing ever."

In May 2018, Klout announced that it would cease operations on May 25, 2018. The closure had been planned for some time and was accelerated by the entry into force of the General Data Protection Regulation.

Business model

Perks
The primary business model for Klout involved companies paying Klout for Perks campaigns, in which a company offers free services or products to Klout users who match a pre-defined set of criteria including their scores, topics, and geographic locations. While Klout users who had received Perks were under no obligation to write about them, the hope was that they will effectively advertise the products on social media. Klout offered the Perks program beginning in 2010. According to Klout CEO Joe Fernandez, about 50 partnerships had been established as of November 2011. In May 2013, Klout announced that its users had claimed more than 1 million Perks across over 400 campaigns.

Klout for business
In March 2013, Klout announced its intention to begin displaying business analytics aimed at helping business and brand users learn about their online audiences.

Content page 
In September 2012, Klout announced an information-sharing partnership with the Bing search engine, showing Klout scores in Bing searches and allowing Klout users to post items selected by Bing to social media.

Criticism

Several objections to Klout's methodology were raised regarding both the process by which scores were generated, and the overall societal effect. Critics pointed out that Klout scores were not representative of the influence a person really has, highlighted by Barack Obama, then President of the United States, having a lower influence score than a number of bloggers. Other social critics argued that the Klout score devalued authentic online communication and promoted social ranking and stratification by trying to quantify human interaction. Klout attempted to address some of these criticisms, and updated their algorithms so that Barack Obama's importance was better reflected.

The site was criticized for violating the privacy of minors, and for exploiting users for its own profit.

John Scalzi described the principle behind Klout's operation as "socially evil" in its exploitation of its users' status anxiety. Charles Stross described the service as "the Internet equivalent of herpes," blogging that his analysis of Klout's terms and conditions revealed that the company's business model was illegal in the United Kingdom, where it conflicted with the Data Protection Act 1998; Stross advised readers to delete their Klout accounts and opt out of Klout services.

Ben Rothke concluded that "Klout has its work cut out, and it seems like they need to be in beta a while longer. Klout can and should be applauded for trying to measure this monstrosity called social influence; but their results of influence should, in truth, carry very little influence."

Klout was criticised for the opacity of their methodology. While it was claimed that advanced machine learning techniques were used, leveraging network theory, Sean Golliher analysed Klout scores of Twitter users and found that the simple logarithm of the number of followers was sufficient to explain 95% of the variance. In November 2015 Klout released an academic paper discussing their methodology at the IEEE BigData 2015 Conference.

In spite of the controversy, some employers made hiring decisions based on Klout scores. As reported in an article for Wired, a man recruited for a VP position with fifteen years of experience consulting for companies including America Online, Ford and Kraft was eliminated as a candidate specifically because of his Klout score, which at the time was 34, in favour of a candidate with a score of 67.

Notable events
 September 2011: Klout integrated with Google+.
 October 2011: Klout changed its scoring algorithm, lowering many scores and creating complaints.
 November 2011: Klout partnered with Wahooly for their beta launch.
 January 2012: Klout was able to raise an estimated $30 million from a host of venture capital firms.
 February 2012: Klout acquired local and mobile neighborhood app Blockboard.
 May 2012: Klout announced growth of 2000 new partners over a one-year period.
 August 14, 2012: Klout changed its algorithm again.
 September 2012: Microsoft announced a strategic investment in Klout for an undisclosed sum.
 March 28, 2013: Klout announced inclusion of Instagram analytics in factoring Klout scores.
 May 13, 2013: Klout users had claimed more than 1 million Perks across over 400 campaigns.
 March 27, 2014:  Lithium Technologies acquired Klout.
 September 14, 2015: Engagement on YouTube content was factored into the Klout Score
 October 29, 2015: Klout exposed inner workings of the Klout Score.
 May 10, 2018: Lithium announced that they would be ending the service on May 25, 2018.

Similar metrics
 Cloze
 Commun.it
 Engagio
 PeerIndex

See also
 Q Score, a rating system for brand/celebrity popularity
 BitClout, a social network based on popularity with monetary value (cryptocurrency) assigned to each user

References

External links
 
 

Web analytics
Social media management platforms
Social media companies
2018 disestablishments in California
2008 establishments in California
Internet properties established in 2008
Internet properties disestablished in 2018